Minibidion is a genus of beetles in the family Cerambycidae, containing the following species:

 Minibidion aquilonium Martins, 1968
 Minibidion argenteum Martins & Napp, 1986
 Minibidion basilare (Martins, 1962)
 Minibidion bicolor Martins, Galileo & de-Oliveira, 2009
 Minibidion bondari (Melzer, 1923)
 Minibidion confine Martins, 1968
 Minibidion craspedum Martins, 1971
 Minibidion minimum Martins & Napp, 1986
 Minibidion minusculum (Martins, 1962)
 Minibidion perfectum Martins & Galileo, 2011
 Minibidion punctipenne Martins, 1968
 Minibidion rurigena (Gounelle, 1909)
 Minibidion tricolor Martins & Galileo, 2007
 Minibidion unifasciatum Martins & Galileo, 2007

References

Ibidionini